The Parachute Commandos Regiments (RPC) are parachute regiments of the 17th Parachute Division of Biskra of the land forces of the Algerian People's National Army.

These regiments are so-called "special troops" regiments by virtue of their missions and status.

History 
Previously the parachutists of the Algerian Army were not in the form of regiments but of groups, the first parachutist regiments, therefore, made their appearance in the 1980s, the first regiments were the 4th, 12th and 18th RPC.

The 1st RPC and the 5th RPC were created in 1995.

These regiments were then integrated into the Centre de Conduite et de Coordination des Actions de Lutte Anti-Subversive (CLAS) also in 1995. The 6th RPC is the last regiment to have been created as it was created in 2009.

The parachute commandos thus belong to the 17th Parachute Division, which is a predominantly infantry division but with more sensitive missions than the infantry regiments.

The 17th Parachute Division, created in 1991 by decree, is specialised in airborne combat and air assault, its main mission being emergency projection.

Organization 
The commando parachute regiments are composed of 6 parachute regiments and 3 auxiliary units :

 Staff of the 17th Parachute Division (17th PD) in Biskra
 1st Commandos Parachute Regiment of Tébessa (1st RPC)
 4th Commandos Parachute Regiment of Laghouat (4th RPC)
 5th Commandos Parachute Regiment of Ain Arnat (5th RPC) 
 6th Commando Parachute Regiment of Jijel (6th RPC)
 12th Commando Parachute Regiment of Biskra (12th RPC)
 18th Commandos Parachute Regiment of Hassi-Messaoud (18th RPC)
 1 Parachute Artillery Regiment
 1 Parachute Engineer Battalion
 1 Parachute Anti-Tank Battalion

The regiments have a strength of about 700 men, that is to say between 9000 and 10000 paratroopers for the 17th DP.

Airborne intervention is the main mode of action of parachutists, they are also capable of engaging under armoured protection with BTR-80s or Fuchs 2s and tactical reconnaissance vehicles, in a very short time and with weapons and equipment... that can be dropped or heliborne into a combat zone.

Each regiment has :

 1 General Staff
 3 Fighting Companies
 1 Logistics Company
 1 Anti-tank Company
 1 Support Company
 1 Transmission Company
 1 Air Defence Company

The 12th RPC is a specialized regiment, with two special operations companies (41st and 45th companies) and specialized sections similar to the French Army's Commando Parachute Group (GCP) or the U.S. 75th Ranger Regiment.

It is the elite parachute regiment for conventional forces (excluding special forces).

Missions 
Parachute commandos act primarily in the air-land environment, the parachutists provide the material and human resources to carry out the missions, and the commandos, therefore, work directly with the other units.

Parachute commandos have the following mission :

 Strategic and special reconnaissance
 Commando action
 Counter-terrorism
 Special Operations Air Mobile Support and Support (in collaboration with Special Forces)
 VIP close protection
 The recovery and protection of strategic objectives

In addition, the RPC is very much present in border security missions, particularly on the Libyan border.

Due to their missions, the RPC have the status of "special troops"; they are the equivalent of the 75th Ranger Regiment.

Training and coaching 
Parachute cadets are trained at the Special Troops Training Centre (CFTS) (for non-commissioned men) which is part of the Special Troops Superior School (ESTS) (which trains non-commissioned officers and officers) in Biskra, where they will be trained in :

 Weapons handling: pistol shooting and automatic rifle, among others.
 Fighting in urban, desert, and forest areas, among others.
 Survival in hostile environments.
 Sabotage and demolitions.
 Skydiving.
 Fighting with bare hands and knives (with handguns or throwing).
 Close combat, kuk sool won is taught to future parachutists.
 Special operations techniques (reconnaissance operations, parachuting, patrolling inside enemy lines, intelligence gathering...).

At the end of the course, the student is subject to a diploma examination.

In addition, some will go for advanced training at the commandos training centre (EFCIP) in Boghar.

Para-commando units are basically organized on the model of the Russian Spetsnaz, and many officers and non-commissioned officers have undergone additional and specialized training in South Korea, China, South Africa, the United Kingdom, the United States, Italy, Germany, Russia, and France.

The level of training there is very advanced in all areas of individual and collective combat (closecombat, shooting, sabotage, camouflage, reconnaissance, parachuting, interrogation of prisoners, etc.).

Equipment and armament

Armament

Handguns 

 Glock 17 & 18
 Caracal

Assault rifle 

 AKMS
 AKM
 AK-103

Machine gun 

 RPD
 RPK
 PKM

Precision rifle 

 Zatsava M93 Black Arrow
 SVD
 HK-G3
 M40A3

Shotgun 

 SR 202P

Other 

 RPG-7
 RPG-29
 METIS-M1
 KORNET-E
 SA-18
 QW-2
 AGS-17
 AGS-30

Personal equipment 

 Spectra helmet, Fast-ops core
 Special troops lattice (lizard, desert woodland)
 Tactical vest
 Bullet-proof vest
 Plate carrier
 Gloves
 Knee and elbow pads
 Thigh or Belt Holster
 Rangers
 Protective goggles
 Camelback
 Fighting bag

Vehicles 

 Mercedes-Benz G Class in 4X4 and pick-up
 Toyota Station in 4X4 or Pick-up
 Toyota Land Cruiser in 4X4 or Pick-up
 Mercedes-Benz Zetros
 Ford F150
 Mercedes-Benz Unimog
 SNVI M 120
 SNVI M 230
 SNVI M 260

Special vehicle 

 Humvee
 Ford F-150 with Mobile Adjustable Ramp System (MARS)
 BTR 80
 Otokar Akrep
 Fuchs 2

References

Military units and formations of Algeria
Special forces of Algeria